Japonactaeon is a genus of small predatory sea snails, marine gastropod molluscs in the family Acteonidae, the barrel bubble snails.

Species
Species within the genus Japonactaeon include:
 Japonactaeon longissimus Valdés, 2008
 Japonactaeon nipponensis (Yamakawa, 1911) (synonym: Acteon nipponensis Yamakawa, 1911)
 Distribution : Japan, Korea
 Length : 10 mm
 Japonactaeon punctostriatus (C. B. Adams, 1840)
 Japonactaeon pusillus (MacGillivray, 1843)
 Distribution : Florida, Japan, Mediterranean
 Length : 11 mm
 Description : found at depths of 200 to 820 m
 Japonactaeon sieboldii (Reeve, 1842)
 Distribution : Japan, Coral Sea, Philippines
 Length : 10 mm
 Description: found on sandy bottoms; whitish shell; first whorl with lighbrown color bordered with darker brown bands.
Species brought into synonymy
 Japonactaeon suturalis (A. Adams, 1855); synonym of Pupa suturalis (A. Adams, 1855)

References

 Taki I. (1956). Japonactaeon, a new genus of Pupidae (Opisthobranchia, Gastropoda). Bulletin of the National Science Museum, Tokyo, N. S. 3(1): 47-51

Acteonidae